Asghar Khan Achakzai (born 4 February 1977) is a Pakistani politician who is a member of the Provincial Assembly of Balochistan.

Personal life
Achakzai was born on 4 February 1977 in Chaman located in Killa Abdullah District of Balochistan, Pakistan. As of 2018, his residence was located in Murda Karez neighborhood of Chaman.

Political career
Achakzai was president of Balochistan wing of Awami National Party from 2014 to 2018. He was elected as a member of Provincial Assembly of Balochistan from the constituency PB-23 (Killa Abdullah-III) on 25 July 2018.

On 20 October 2018, he was made member of a committee which is tasked to discuss the matters related to Saindak Copper Gold Project with federal government so that Balochistan's share of revenue generated from that project can be granted to the province exchequer according to the provisions of 18th Amendment to the Constitution of Pakistan.

References

Living people
Politicians from Balochistan, Pakistan
Awami National Party MPAs (Balochistan)
1977 births